The Styx River is a river in the eastern portion of Central Queensland, Australia.

The river rises in the Connors and Broadsound Range and enters Broad Sound south of the Port of St Lawrence and to the north of the town of Ogmore. The river is crossed by both the Bruce Highway and North Coast railway line. From source to mouth, the river descends  over its  course.

The Styx River is wide at its mouth, resulting in a tidal bore at certain times. Much of the river valley remains natural leaving the water quality in a healthy state.

See also

References

Rivers of Queensland
Central Queensland